Noreen Hay (born 10 March 1951) is an Australian politician and a former member of the New South Wales Legislative Assembly.  She represented Wollongong for the Labor Party from 2003 to 2016. In July 2015, Hay stood down as NSW Opposition whip due to allegations of electoral fraud and branch stacking.

In August 2016, Hay resigned from the NSW Legislative Assembly triggering a by-election.

Early life
Hay was born in London into a working-class family of practising Christians. She was the second eldest of five children to parents Nora and Tadg Herlihy, who had migrated to the United Kingdom from Cork, Ireland. She married Christopher Martin Hay and in 1982 they migrated with their four children to Wollongong, New South Wales.

Hay enrolled in Wollongong TAFE and subsequently found employment with the NSW Home Care Service, caring for the elderly and bedridden in Wollongong's outer suburbs. She became a union official and regional secretary of the Miscellaneous Workers' Union and worked as an electorate officer to Jennie George, the Federal Member for Throsby.

Political career
In 2002, she won ALP preselection from the sitting member, Col Markham, and was the first woman elected for the seat of Wollongong.

Following the 2007 election, Hay was appointed Parliamentary Secretary to Health Minister Reba Meagher. She was stood down in February 2008 by the Premier Iemma being named in an ICAC inquiry into Wollongong Council. Hay was re-appointed in March 2008 after being cleared by the ICAC.

State Premier Nathan Rees dismissed Noreen Hay from her position as Parliamentary Secretary for Health on 12 September 2008 after allegations arose that she participated in simulated mammary intercourse with Police Minister Matt Brown at an office party in June. Both Brown and Hay denied the allegations.

References

 

1951 births
Living people
Members of the New South Wales Legislative Assembly
Australian Labor Party members of the Parliament of New South Wales
English emigrants to Australia
Australian people of Irish descent
People from Wollongong
21st-century Australian politicians
Women members of the New South Wales Legislative Assembly
21st-century Australian women politicians